Martín de la Puente and Nicolas Peifer defeated the five-time defending champions Alfie Hewett and Gordon Reid in the final, 4–6, 7–5, [10–6] to win the men's doubles wheelchair tennis title at the 2022 US Open. It was de la Puente's maiden major title, and Peifer's eighth in doubles.

Seeds

Draw

Finals

References

External links 
 Draw

Wheelchair men's doubles
U.S. Open, 2022 men's doubles